Veronica agrestis, commonly known as green field speedwell, is a species of flowering plant in the family Plantaginaceae.

References

Further reading

Flora of Europe
agrestis
Plants described in 1753
Taxa named by Carl Linnaeus